Systemes d'Information et Management is a French peer-reviewed academic journal, published by Eska (Paris), that covers theoretical and empirical research in the areas of information systems and information technology. Topics include computer science, operations research, design science, organization theory and behavior, knowledge management, enterprise system, cloud computing, IS architecture; IT and health, data analyze and management. The chief editor is Professor R. Meissonier (Montpellier University)and it is affiliated with the Association for Information Systems.

References

French-language journals
Information technology in France
Information systems journals
Quarterly journals